Ayşe Melis Gürkaynak (born April 20, 1990) is a Turkish volleyball player. She plays for Vakıfbank Spor Kulübü and wears the number 8.

Clubs
  VakıfBank Güneş Sigorta Türk Telekom (2005-2008)
  Galatasaray Women's Volleyball Team (2008–2009)
  Beşiktaş Women's Volleyball Team (2009–2010)
  VakıfBank Güneş Sigorta Türk Telekom (2010- )

Awards

National team
 2015 Women's European Volleyball League –

Clubs
 2010–11 CEV Women's Champions League -   Champion, with VakıfBank Güneş Sigorta Türk Telekom
 2011 FIVB Women's Club World Championship -  Runner-Up, with VakıfBank Türk Telekom
 2011-12 Turkish Women's Volleyball League -  Runner-Up, with Vakıfbank Spor Kulübü
 2012-13 Turkish Cup -  Champion, with Vakıfbank Spor Kulübü
 2012–13 CEV Champions League -  Champion, with Vakıfbank Spor Kulübü
 2012-13 Turkish Women's Volleyball League -  Champion, with Vakıfbank Spor Kulübü
2021–22 CEV Women's Champions League -  Champion, with Vakıfbank Spor Kulübü

See also
 Turkish women in sports

References

1990 births
Living people
Turkish women's volleyball players
VakıfBank S.K. volleyballers
Sportspeople from Ankara
Galatasaray S.K. (women's volleyball) players
20th-century Turkish sportswomen
21st-century Turkish sportswomen